Alan Leonard Rees (18 May 1949 – 28 November 2014) was a British writer and teacher about film, who advised the Arts Council, the British Film Institute, the Tate Gallery and the Arts & Humanities Research Council.

He was the author of A History of Experimental Film and Video (2011), which remains an influential and standard textbook on the subject. Until his retirement, he was a tutor in visual communication at the Kent Institute of Art & Design formerly known as Maidstone College of Art and later the Royal College of Art in London.

Bibliography
  A History of Experimental Film and Video, BFI Publishing, 2011, 208 p.

References

1949 births
2014 deaths
British writers